Roszkowice may refer to the following places:
Roszkowice, Lubusz Voivodeship (west Poland)
Roszkowice, Brzeg County in Opole Voivodeship (south-west Poland)
Roszkowice, Kluczbork County in Opole Voivodeship (south-west Poland)
Roszkowice, Opole County in Opole Voivodeship (south-west Poland)
Roszkowice, West Pomeranian Voivodeship (north-west Poland)